Mila (Cyrillic: Мила) is a female Slavic name originating from Central or Eastern Europe. It is a  diminutive of Slavic names beginning or ending with Mila which derived from the element Mil (Мил) meaning "gracious" or "dear". It is also used among the Spanish as a short-hand for Milagros, meaning "miracles".

Notable people
Mila Gojsalić (died 1530), Croatian folk heroine
Mila Horvat (born 1981), Croatian television host
Mila Kunis (born 1983), American actress
Mila Mason (born 1963), American country music artist
Mila Mulroney (born 1953), Serbian-Canadian campaigner
Mila Nikolova (1962–2018), Bulgarian mathematician
Mila, in the Mila affair, subjected to  online abuse after criticising Islam

Fictional characters 
Mila (Dead or Alive), in the video game Dead or Alive 5
Mila (Doctor Who), in audio dramas based on the TV series Doctor Who
Mila (Star Trek), in the TV series Star Trek: Deep Space Nine
Mila, the goddess of Valentia and the sister of Duma in the video game Fire Emblem Gaiden
Mila, in the video game Hotel Dusk: Room 215
Mila, in the German release of the Japanese anime Attack No. 1 (retitled Mila Superstar)
Mila, in the children's book The Music of Dolphins by Karen Hesse
Mila Babicheva, in the anime Yuri on Ice

See also
Milla (disambiguation)
Ludmila (given name)
Milada (name)
Milena (name)
Milagros
Mile (given name)
Milica

References 

Slavic feminine given names
Croatian feminine given names
Russian feminine given names
Serbian feminine given names
Ukrainian feminine given names
Arabic feminine given names
Hebrew feminine given names